Coleophora nigrostriata is a moth of the family Coleophoridae. It is found in the United States, including Oregon.

References

nigrostriata
Moths described in 1882
Moths of North America